The Basement Tapes is a collection of over 100 songs recorded by Bob Dylan and his then-backing group, the Band, in the summer of 1967 in West Saugerties, New York, just outside Woodstock. Recording sessions began in a den known as "The Red Room" in Dylan's home, before moving to an improvised recording studio in the basement of a house known as Big Pink, where Rick Danko, Richard Manuel and Garth Hudson lived. Roughly half the songs recorded on The Basement Tapes were covers of traditional folk and blues ballads, rock songs, and country music, and half were original compositions by Dylan.

Fourteen basement tape songs appeared in 1968 on a demo privately circulated by Dylan's publishing company, Dwarf Music. Public awareness of the basement recordings increased with the release of the first bootleg, Great White Wonder, in 1969. In 1975 CBS officially released The Basement Tapes, but only sixteen of the twenty-four songs were recorded by Dylan and the Band in Woodstock in 1967. The other eight tracks were recordings by the Band from different times. Subsequently, more and more basement recordings have been unearthed and illicitly released, culminating in the release of a five-CD bootleg set in 1990, The Genuine Basement Tapes, containing 108 tracks. Two songs, "I Shall Be Released" and "Santa-Fe" were officially released on The Bootleg Series Volumes 1–3 (Rare & Unreleased) 1961–1991 in 1991. "I'm Not There" was released on the soundtrack album accompanying the biographical film about Dylan, directed by Todd Haynes, named after the song. "Minstrel Boy" was released in 2013 on The Bootleg Series Vol. 10: Another Self Portrait (1969–1971).  The songs of the Basement Tapes have been catalogued by Greil Marcus in his book Invisible Republic, and by Sid Griffin in his critical study Million Dollar Bash: Bob Dylan, the Band, and the Basement Tapes.

On November 4, 2014, Columbia/Legacy issued The Bootleg Series Vol. 11: The Basement Tapes Complete, an official 6-CD box set containing 138 tracks which comprise all of Dylan's basement recordings, including 30 never-bootlegged tracks.

Below is an alphabetical list of songs from these recording sessions. This list does not include songs that feature only the members of the Band.

Songs

Footnotes

Sources
 Barker, Derek. Bob Dylan: The Songs He Didn't Write: Bob Dylan Under the Influence (New Malden:  Chrome Dreams 2008). 
 Griffin, Sid. Million Dollar Bash: Bob Dylan, the Band, and the Basement Tapes (London: Jawbone,  2007). 
 Heylin, Clinton. The Recording Sessions [1960–1994] (New York: St. Martin's Press, 1995). 
 Marcus, Greil, with Michael Simmons. The Bootleg Series Vol. 10 – Another Self Portrait (1969–1971) CD booklet (2013).
 Marcus, Greil. Invisible Republic: Bob Dylan's Basement Tapes (New York: Henry Holt, 1997)  later re-published as:
 Marcus, Greil. The Old, Weird America (New York: St Martin's Press, 2001) 
 Sounes, Howard, Down the Highway: The Life of Bob Dylan, Grove Press, 2001.

See also 
 The Basement Tapes (1975 album)
 The Bootleg Series Vol. 11: The Basement Tapes Complete
 List of Basement Tapes songs (1975)

External links
 Bob Dylan 1967 session pages at Olof Björner's website.

 Basement Tapes
Lists of songs
The Band songs
1970s-related lists